Claudio Andrés Álvarez González (born 19 April 1967) is a Chilean former footballer who played as a striker. Besides Chile, he played in Switzerland.

Career
A forward from the Santiago Wanderers youth system, Álvarez began his career with them in the Chilean second division and after he was with Defensor Casablanca and Ferroviarios in the third level.

In the Chilean top division, Álvarez played for Unión Española, Cobresal, Deportes La Serena and Provincial Osorno. He also made appearances for Deportes Antofagasta in the 1993 Copa Chile.

In the second division, he also played for Unión San Felipe, Deportes Puerto Montt and Unión Santa Cruz. With Santiago Wanderers, he got three promotions to the top level in 1985, 1989 and 1995, winning the league title in the last.

In 1991, he had a stint with Swiss side FC Baden, alongside his compatriots Eduardo Soto and Ramón Pérez.

Personal life
He is nicknamed Tanque (Tank), as his father , a former footballer and historical player of Santiago Wanderers.

He has worked as a football coach for children in his city of birth in a municipal project called Casa del Deporte (Sports Place) alongside former footballers such as Luis Alberto Lufi and Juan Carlos Ceballos.

References

External links
 Claudio Álvarez at MemoriaWanderers.cl

1967 births
Living people
Sportspeople from Viña del Mar
Chilean footballers
Chilean expatriate footballers
Chilean Primera División players
Unión Española footballers
Cobresal footballers
C.D. Antofagasta footballers
Deportes La Serena footballers
Provincial Osorno footballers
Primera B de Chile players
Santiago Wanderers footballers
Unión San Felipe footballers
Puerto Montt footballers
Deportes Santa Cruz footballers
Tercera División de Chile players
Ferroviarios footballers
Swiss Challenge League players
FC Baden players
Chilean expatriate sportspeople in Switzerland
Expatriate footballers in Switzerland
Association football midfielders